Solanum pennellii (syn. Lycopersicon pennellii) is a species of wild tomato in the family Solanaceae. It is native to the Galápagos Islands, Peru, and northern Chile. It is being extensively studied for its drought resistance and other traits in an effort to improve the cultivated tomato, Solanum lycopersicum.

Subtaxa
The following varieties are accepted:
Solanum pennellii var. elachistus  – Tarapacá Region, Chile
Solanum pennellii var. pennellii

References

pennellii
Flora of the Galápagos Islands
Flora of Peru
Flora of northern Chile
Plants described in 1958